The 2021–22 Liga Unike was the second season of the Liga Unike, a professional basketball league in Albania and Kosovo. The season began on 23 October 2021 and will end in 2022.

Teams
Top four teams from 2020–21 Albanian Basketball Superleague and 2020–21 Kosovo Basketball Superleague respectively will participate in the competition.

Venues and locations

Note: Table lists in alphabetical order.

Notes
ABSL = Albanian Basketball Superleague
ABFD = Albanian Basketball First Division
KBSL = Kosovo Basketball Superleague

Regular season

Standings
</onlyinclude>

References

External links
 

Liga Unike